Simon Sjödin (born 4 October 1986) is a Swedish competitive swimmer who represented Sweden at both the 2008 Olympic Games and the 2016 Olympic Games. He is of Gambian descent.

Biography
Simon Sjödin was born on 4 October 1986 into parents Kristina and Omar.

Sjödin won his first Swedish Swimming Championships title in 2005, when he won the 200 meter butterfly.

In 2007, he changed swim club from Södertörns SS to SK Neptun.

In 2008, Simon Sjödin competed in the 2008 Summer Olympics representing Sweden. He finished 26th in the 200 m butterfly and 11th with the Swedish team in the 4 × 100 m medley relay.

In 2016, he competed in the 2016 Summer Olympics having qualified to swim both 200 m butterfly and 200 m individual medley. Simon reached the semi-final in 200 m butterfly with a time of 1.56.46 beating the Swedish national record in the process. In the semi-final he ended up at 6th place in his heat and ranked 13th overall.

Personal bests

Long course (50 m)

Short course (25 m)

Clubs
Södertörns SS (-2007)
SK Neptun (2007-)

References

External links

Swedish male backstroke swimmers
Swedish male butterfly swimmers
Swedish male medley swimmers
1986 births
Living people
Swimmers at the 2008 Summer Olympics
Swimmers at the 2016 Summer Olympics
Olympic swimmers of Sweden
European Aquatics Championships medalists in swimming
Södertörns SS swimmers
SK Neptun swimmers
Swedish people of Gambian descent
Swimmers from Stockholm